At the 2011 Pan Arab Games, the wrestling events were held at Aspire Zone in Doha, Qatar from 16–20 December. A total of 14 events were contested.

Medal summary

Men

Freestyle

Greco-Roman

Medal table

References

External links
Wrestling at official website

Pan Arab Games
Events at the 2011 Pan Arab Games
2011 Pan Arab Games
Wrestling in Qatar